Sant'Antonino-Vaie is a railway station in Sant'Antonino di Susa, Italy. The station is located on the Turin-Modane railway. The train services are operated by Trenitalia.

Train services
The station is served by the following services:

Turin Metropolitan services (SFM3) Bardonecchia - Bussoleno - Turin
Turin Metropolitan services (SFM3) Susa - Bussoleno - Turin

References

External links

This article is based upon a translation of the Italian language version as at October 2015.

Railway stations in Piedmont